The discography of Nik Kershaw consists of nine studio albums, three live albums, eight compilation albums, one extended play and 27 singles. His 62 weeks on the UK Singles Chart between 1984 and 1985 beat all other solo artists.

Albums

Studio albums

Live albums

Compilation albums

Remix albums
 98 Remixes (1998)

Singles

Notes

References

External links

Discographies of British artists
New wave discographies